Mamidipudi Anandam was an Indian politician. He was a Member of Parliament  representing Andhra Pradesh in the Rajya Sabha the upper house of India's Parliament as member of the Indian National Congress.

References

Rajya Sabha members from Andhra Pradesh
Indian National Congress politicians
1919 births
2001 deaths